Events from the year 1856 in Scotland.

Incumbents

Law officers 
 Lord Advocate – James Moncreiff
 Solicitor General for Scotland – Edward Maitland

Judiciary 
 Lord President of the Court of Session and Lord Justice General – Lord Colonsay
 Lord Justice Clerk – Lord Glencorse

Events 
 4 January – Faculty of Actuaries established.
 February – an oak and a yew tree associated with William Wallace at his reputed birthplace of Elderslie are blown down in a storm.
 1 April – Aberdeen Waterloo railway station opens to serve the Great North of Scotland Railway main line to Keith.
 November – James Clerk Maxwell takes up an appointment as Professor of Natural Philosophy at Marischal College, Aberdeen.
 31 December – Lord Brougham's Act requires at least one party to a marriage contracted after this date to have been resident in Scotland for 21 days, putting a curb on Gretna Green marriage.

 Trinity College, Glasgow, established as a Church College of the Free Church of Scotland.
 Dunfermline claims city status in the United Kingdom by historical usage; the status is never officially recognised.
 William McEwan opens McEwan's Fountain Brewery at Fountainbridge in Edinburgh.
 The iron steamboat Thomas is built for service on the Forth and Clyde Canal, origin of the Clyde puffer.
 The Clyde Model Yacht Club, a predecessor of the Royal Northern and Clyde Yacht Club, is established.

Births 
 30 May – James Pittendrigh Macgillivray, sculptor and poet (died 1938)
 5 July – Ion Keith-Falconer, road racing cyclist, Arabic scholar and missionary (died 1887 in Aden)
 15 August – Keir Hardie, socialist and labour leader (died 1915)
 13 September – Henry Halcro Johnston, botanist, army physician and rugby union international (died 1939)
 27 November – Matthew Stirling, locomotive engineer (died 1931 in Hull)
 1 December – Malcolm Smith, Liberal politician (died 1935)
 William W. Naismith, mountaineer (died 1935)
 William Robertson, industrialist (died 1923)

Deaths 
 August – James Bremner, shipbuilder and salvor (born 1784)
 30 August – John Ross, naval officer and Arctic explorer (born 1777)
 20 September – Samuel Morison Brown, chemist, poet and essayist (born 1817)
 23/24 December – Hugh Miller, geologist, by suicide (born 1802)
 25 February – George Don, botanist (born 1798)

The arts
 McLellan Galleries opened in Glasgow.

See also 
 Timeline of Scottish history
 1856 in the United Kingdom

References 

 
Years of the 19th century in Scotland
Scotland
1850s in Scotland